Samuel Rösch (born 24 August 1994) is a German singer. He appeared on and won the eighth season of The Voice of Germany.

References 

1994 births
Living people
21st-century German  male  singers
English-language singers from Germany
German pop singers
The Voice (franchise) winners
Winner08
Universal Music Group artists